The 15417 / 15418 Rajya Rani  Express is an Express  train belonging to Indian Railways Northeast Frontier Railway zone that runs between  and Silghat Town in India.This train is a part of Rajya Rani Express series from West Bengal & Assam state.

It operates as train number 15417 from Alipurduar Junction to Silghat Town and as train number 15418 in the reverse direction, serving the states of  West Bengal & Assam.

Coaches
The 15417 / 18 Rajya Rani  Express has one sleeper class, six general unreserved & two SLR (seating with luggage rake) coaches. It does not carry a pantry car.

As is customary with most train services in India, coach composition may be amended at the discretion of Indian Railways depending on demand.

Service

Routing
The 15417/15418 Rajya Rani Express runs from 
Alipurduar Junction via 

Tufanganj Railway Station

 to 
Silghat Town.

Traction
As the route is not electrified, a -based WDM-3D / WDM-3A diesel locomotive pulls the train to its destination.

References

External links
15417 Rajya Rani Express at India Rail Info
15418 Rajya Rani Express at India Rail Info

Rajya Rani Express trains
Transport in Alipurduar
Rail transport in West Bengal
Rail transport in Assam
Alipurduar railway division